The qianlima (also chollima, cheollima, and senrima) is a mythical horse that originates from the Chinese classics and is commonly portrayed in East Asian mythology. The winged horse is said to be too swift and elegant to be mounted by any mortal man and is named after its ability to travel one thousand li in a single day.

Since the 3rd century BCE, the qianlima was used as a metaphor for exceptionally talented people and animals, such as Red Hare. The chollima is an important symbol in North Korea and is the namesake of the Chollima Movement.

China
Beginning around the 3rd century BCE, Chinese classics mention Bole, a mythological horse-tamer, as an exemplar of horse judging. Bole is frequently associated with the fabled qianlima "thousand-miles horse", which was supposedly able to gallop one thousand li (approximately 400 km) in a single day (e.g. Red Hare, sweats blood horse). Qianlima was a literary Chinese word for people with latent talent and ability; and Spring (1988:180) suggests, "For centuries of Chinese history, horses had been considered animals capable of performing feats requiring exceptional strength and endurance. Possibly it is for this reason that from early times horses have been used allegorically to represent extraordinary people." Bole recognizing a qianlima was a metaphor for a wise ruler selecting talented shi "scholar-officials". Thus, (Henry 1987:28) "Geniuses in obscurity were called thousand li horses who had not yet met their [Bole]".

Japan
Keitoku Senrima (Kim Ge-dok), a professional middleweight boxer in Japan, uses the stage name "Senrima" (the Japanese form of Qianlima/Chollima) to reference North Korea's Chollima campaigns and thereby express his Zainichi Korean heritage.

North Korea

The chollima is an important symbol in North Korea. It is used as the nickname of its national association football team. The state also gave the name to the Chollima Movement, which promoted fast economic development, similar to that of the Chinese Great Leap Forward and the Soviet Stakhanovite movement. After the Korean War, the country required rebuilding to function again. In order to expedite the construction, President Kim Il-sung devised the slogan "rush as the speed of chollima".

Several statues are found of this creature in Pyongyang, the capital of North Korea. The Chollima Statue symbolizes "heroism, the constant, fighting spirit of the Korean people, and the innovations and advance so quickly, at the speed of the chollima". A notable one can be found near , which was finished on 15 April 1961. It stands roughly 46 meters high and 16 meters long, measured from the pavement to the top of the Red Letter of the Central Committee of the Workers' Party of Korea representing the working class.

See also 
 Longma
 Pegasus
 Tianma
 Tulpar
 Horse in Chinese mythology

References 

Chinese legendary creatures
East Asian mythology
Korean legendary creatures
Horses in mythology
Winged horses
Horses in Chinese mythology